Uiseong is a town, or eup in Uiseong County, North Gyeongsang Province, South Korea. The township Uiseong-myeon was upgraded to the town Uiseong-eup in 1940. Uiseong County Office and Uiseong Town Office are located in Hujuk-ri.

Communities
Uiseong-eup is divided into 13 villages (ri).

References

External links
Official website 

Uiseong County
Towns and townships in North Gyeongsang Province